Little Musgrave is a small village and former civil parish, now in the parish of Musgrave, in the Eden district of Cumbria, England. In 1891 the parish had a population of 52.

Location

The village is situated at 500 ft above sea level in the upper reaches of the Eden Valley just south of the Eden River and two and one-half miles west-south-west of Brough.

The village lies within the historic county of Westmorland.

History 
Little Musgrave was formerly a township in Crosby-Garret parish, from 1866 Little Musgrave was a civil parish in its own right until it was abolished on 30 December 1894 and merged with "Great Musgrave" to form "Musgrave".

Notable residents
William Edmundson (1627—1712), founder of the Quaker faith in Ireland.

See also

Listed buildings in Musgrave, Cumbria
Musgrave railway station

References

External links
 Cumbria County History Trust: Musgrave (nb: provisional research only – see Talk page)

Location grid

Villages in Cumbria
Former civil parishes in Cumbria
Eden District